Búng Bình Thiên, or God Lake, is a fresh water lake in the Mekong Delta in Vietnam. Located in An Giang province within An Phu District,  Búng Bình Thiên links three communes, namely Khánh Bình, Nhơn Hội and Quốc Thái, as well as the adjoining Bình Di River and Hậu River.

Lake surface area
The lake has a water surface area of 200 hectares and is four meters deep in the dry season. During the rainy season, the influx of water from the Mekong River causes the surface area to expand to 800 hectares, with a depth of up to seven meters.

Landscape quality
The lake is tranquil year round. When the Mekong Delta floods, most rivers become muddy with alluvium; however the water of Búng Bình Thiên remains clear and blue, which endows the landscape with the highest biological diversity in An Giang.

Cham people

The area around Búng Bình Thiên is home to many ethnic Cham people. They live around the lake and in the villages of Khánh Bình, Nhơn Hội and Quốc Thái. Until recently the Cham ladies lived very sheltered lives but nowadays they are engaged in the modern world, developing businesses and participating in cultural and artistic activities in society.

References 

Mekong Delta
Lakes of Vietnam
Landforms of An Giang province